Green Lake is a lake in Isanti County, in the U.S. state of Minnesota.

Green Lake was named for the greenish tint frequently caused by algae.

See also
List of lakes in Minnesota

References

Lakes of Minnesota
Lakes of Isanti County, Minnesota